Bangladesh–Russia relations are the foreign relations between Bangladesh and Russia.  Russia has an embassy in Dhaka and a consulate-general in Chittagong, while Bangladesh has an embassy in Moscow. Diplomatic relations between the USSR and Bangladesh were established on January 25, 1972. These relations have continued with Russia being the successor state to the Soviet Union.

Soviet-Bangladeshi relations 
The Soviet Union had been a strong supporter of the Mukti Bahini during the Bangladesh Liberation War and provided extensive aid, recognising that Bangladesh's independence would weaken the position of its rivals – the United States and China. In November 1971, the Soviet ambassador to Pakistan, Alexei Rodionov, directed a secretive message (Rodionov message) that ultimately warned Pakistan that "it will be embarking on a suicidal course if it escalates tensions in the subcontinent. On 6 and 13 December, the Soviet Navy dispatched two groups of cruisers and destroyers, armed with nuclear missiles from Vladivostok, to trail the United States' Task Force 74 in the Indian Ocean from 18 December until 7 January 1972. The Soviets also had a Ballistic missile submarine to ward off the threat posed by the USS Enterprise task force in the Indian Ocean.

Relations with the Soviet Union were cordial in the years immediately following independence. The Soviet Union supported Indian actions in aiding the war of independence, and after the war the Soviet Navy sent a floating workshop to Bangladesh for clearing Pakistani mines from the Chittagong and Chalna harbours. After independence, the newly formed Bangladesh Air Force received a significant donation from the Soviet Union. Among the aircraft delivered were ten single-seat Mikoyan-Gurevich MiG-21MFs and two twin-seat Mikoyan-Gurevich MiG-21UMs. In March 1972, Bangladeshi Prime Minister Sheikh Mujibur Rahman visited Moscow, in part to thank the Soviet state for their support for Bangladeshi liberation movement in 1971.

After the 1975 coup in Bangladesh, relations with the Soviet Union rapidly cooled. The military regimes of Zia and Ershad deemphasized socialist policies and vied for closer ties with the United States, Arab states, Pakistan, and the People's Republic of China—all of which were politically distant from the Soviet Union. Bangladesh condemned Soviet support for Vietnamese military intervention in Cambodia, and Bangladesh also strongly opposed the 1979 Soviet military intervention in Afghanistan along with other Western and Islamic nations. In 1989, the Soviet Union ranked 14th among aid donors to Bangladesh. The Soviets focused on the development of electrical power, natural gas and oil, and maintained active cultural relations with Bangladesh. They financed the Ghorasal thermal power station, the largest in Bangladesh. A low point in Bangladeshi-Soviet relations came after the expulsion of nine Soviet diplomats from Dhaka in December 1983 and January 1984 by the unpopular military regime of General Ershad.

Russian-Bangladeshi relations

State visits 
In 2009, Bangladeshi Prime Minister Sheikh Hasina visited St. Petersburg and met Russian President Vladimir Putin. In January 2013, Sheikh Hasina again met Russian President Putin in Moscow.

Energy cooperation 
In 2012, the two countries signed two key Memorandums of Understanding (MoU) which would further facilitate collaboration between the two countries in developing the nuclear power sector in Bangladesh.

Defence cooperation 
Russia has conducted a military sales effort in Bangladesh and has succeeded with a $124 million deal for eight MIG-29 fighter jets.

See also 
 Foreign relations of Bangladesh
 Foreign relations of Russia
 List of Ambassadors of Russia to Bangladesh

References

Further reading
 Choudhury, G.W. India, Pakistan, Bangladesh, and the Major Powers: Politics of a Divided Subcontinent (1975), relations with US, USSR and China.

External links
 Embassy of Bangladesh in Russia
 Embassy of Russia in Bangladesh

 
Russia
Bilateral relations of Russia